Minuscule 388 (in the Gregory-Aland numbering), ε 302 (Soden), is a Greek minuscule manuscript of the New Testament, on parchment. Palaeographically it has been assigned to the 13th century. 
It has marginalia.

Description 

The codex contains the text of the four Gospels on 315 parchment leaves. It is written in one column per page, in 21 lines per page.

There is also a division according to the smaller Ammonian Sections (in Mark 233 Sections, the last in 16:8), with references to the Eusebian Canons (written below Ammonian Section numbers).

It is ornamented with silver.

Text 

The Greek text of the codex is a representative of the Byzantine text-type. Hermann von Soden classified it to the textual family Kx. Aland placed it in Category V.

According to the Claremont Profile Method it represents textual family Π171 in Luke 1 (weak), Luke 10, and Luke 20. It creates textual pair with 2584.

The text of the Pericope Adulterae (John 7:53-8:11) is omitted.

History 

It was variously dated in the past (11th, 12th, 13th century). Currently it is dated by the INTF to the 13th century.

The manuscript once belonged to Alexius and Theodora, then, together with 386, 389, and 390 belonged to Giovanni Angelo Herzog von Altaemps († 1627).

The manuscript was added to the list of New Testament manuscripts by Scholz (1794–1852).
It was examined and described by Giuseppe Cozza-Luzi.
C. R. Gregory saw it in 1886.

The manuscript is currently housed at the Vatican Library (Ottob. gr. 212) in Rome.

See also 

 List of New Testament minuscules
 Biblical manuscript
 Textual criticism

References

Further reading 

 

Greek New Testament minuscules
13th-century biblical manuscripts
Manuscripts of the Vatican Library